Kuna Crest is a mountain range near Tuolumne Meadows, in Yosemite National Park, California.

Name
The word Kuna probably derives from a Shoshonean word meaning "fire," which appears in the Mono dialect of the area, with a meaning of firewood. On the summit of near-by Kuna Peak, there are many jagged pieces of rock which resemble fire themselves; see Kuna Crest Granodiorite.

Geography and geology
The Crest lies between two U-shaped glacial valleys: Lyell Canyon and the canyon of the Parker Pass Creek. Mammoth Peak lies at the northern end of the Kuna Crest. A number of lakes lie in cirques cut into the eastern edge of the Crest, including Kuna Lake, Bingaman Lake, Spillway Lake, and Helen Lake. 

The Crest consists of Kuna Crest Granodiorite, which is the oldest granitic rock of the Tuolumne Intrusive Suite. It is rich in biotite and hornblende.

Rock climbing
Climbing on Kuna Crest consists of mostly of walking and scrambling; there isn't much rock climbing, on Kuna Crest proper. There is a traverse, between Mammoth Peak and Kuna Peak.

References

External links 
 summitpost on Kuna Crest South

Cretaceous magmatism
Igneous petrology of California
Yosemite National Park